Serratifusus is a genus of sea snails, marine gastropod mollusks in the family Austrosiphonidae, the true whelks.

Species
Species within the genus Serratifusus include:
 † Serratifusus craspedotus'' (Tate, 1888) 
 Serratifusus excelens Fraussen Hadorn, 2003
 Serratifusus harasewychi Fraussen Hadorn, 2003
 Serratifusus lineatus Harasewych, 1991
 Serratifusus sitanius Fraussen Hadorn, 2003
 Serratifusus virginiae'' Harasewych, 1991

References

 Darragh, T.A. (1969). A revision of the family Columbariidae (Mollusca: Gastropoda). Proceedings of the Royal Society of Victoria. 83(1): 63-119.
 Fraussen, K.; Hadorn, R. (2003). Six new Buccinidae (Mollusca: Gastropoda) from New Caledonia. Novapex. 4(2-3): 33-50

External links
 Tate R. (1888). The gastropods of the older Tertiary of Australia. (Part I). Transactions of the Royal Society of South Australia. 10: 91-176, pls 1-13.

Austrosiphonidae